This is a list of Indian reservations in the U.S. state of Oregon.

Existing reservations
There are seven Native American reservations in Oregon that belong to seven of the nine federally recognized Oregon tribes:

Burns Paiute Indian Colony, of the Burns Paiute Tribe:  in Harney County
Coos, Lower Umpqua and Siuslaw Reservation, of Confederated Tribes of Coos, Lower Umpqua and Siuslaw Indians is less than 
Coquille Reservation includes  of land held in trust for the Coquille Tribe in and around Coos Bay, Oregon 
Grand Ronde Community, of the Confederated Tribes of the Grand Ronde Community of Oregon: , mostly in Yamhill County, with the rest in Polk County
Siletz Reservation, of the Confederated Tribes of Siletz: ,  of which is in Lincoln County 
Umatilla Reservation, of the Confederated Tribes of the Umatilla Indian Reservation: , mostly in Umatilla County, with the rest in Union County
Warm Springs Reservation, of the Confederated Tribes of Warm Springs: , mostly in Wasco County and Jefferson County, with parts in Clackamas, Marion, and Linn counties

Planned reservations
Cow Creek Reservation, of the Cow Creek Band of Umpqua Tribe of Indians
Klamath Reservation, of the Klamath Tribes

Celilo Village
Celilo Village is not a reservation but is owned by the United States and held in trust by the Bureau of Indian Affairs for the use of the Umatilla, Tenino (Warm Springs) and Yakama tribes and Columbia River Indians.

Fort McDermitt, Nevada-Oregon
One reservation in Oregon, for a Nevada tribe, straddles Oregon's southern border with Nevada:
Fort McDermitt Indian Reservation, of the Fort McDermitt Paiute and Shoshone Tribes: near McDermitt in Humboldt County, Nevada and Malheur County, Oregon

Historic reservations
Coastal Indian Reservation, formed in 1856, a much smaller remnant exists as the Siletz Reservation
Malheur Indian Reservation
Table Rock Indian Reservation

See also 
 Federally recognized tribes
 List of Indian reservations in the United States
 Lists of Oregon-related topics

References

External links 
 Oregon Directory of American Indian Resources, in PDF format

Indian reservations in Oregon
Reservations
Native American-related lists